Rashid Abu Khawla is a commander in the Syrian Democratic Forces and former Syrian Opposition leader based in Deir ez-Zor.

Background
Prior to the Syrian Civil War Khawla was reportedly involved in stealing motorcycles and was imprisoned for it by Syrian state authorities. As the war began he joined the Syrian Opposition in Deir ez-Zor and established his own militia which allegedly took part in running checkpoints that would extort and steal from drivers.

Biography

Prior to SDF
In 2013 he and his group assisted the Syrian rebels in besieging the 113th Brigade of the Syrian army in Deir ez-Zor. 

In 2014 after the rise of the Islamic State of Iraq and the Levant (ISIL) he pledged allegiance to the group. However he later left the group and fled to Turkey after ISIL executed his brother.

After joining SDF

By February 2016 he had returned to Syria and claimed to have established a new group allied with the Syrian Democratic Forces, opposed to ISIL. 

In March 2016, he formally announced that he and his group had joined SDF, and he would later become the spokesman of SDF's Deir ez-Zor Military Council. 

On 24 March 2016, he announced that the Deir ez-Zor Military Council had captured several villages from ISIL in northwestern Deir ez-Zor.

In February 2017, he was arrested by the SDF which accused him and his group known as the "Gathering of the Baggara Youth" of not effectively participating in SDF's offensive against ISIL, however activists and individuals linked to him and his group claimed SDF arrested him for his desire to integrate fighters who had defected from groups that took part in Operation Euphrates Shield into his ranks. He was held for at least four days and later released.

In September 2017, during a standoff between Syrian government forces and the SDF, he said speaking on behalf of the SDF and the Deir ez-Zor Military Council, that the SDF would fight the Syrian government if they attacked or entered SDF held areas and he also claimed that the SDF would take over all of Deir ez-Zor.

In April 2019, activists reported that he became involved with oil smuggling from Deir ez-Zor with an individual known as "Abu Bakr al-Homsi", that reportedly served as a broker on behalf of a company, between the SDF and the Syrian government, and he had also previously organized oil sales on behalf of ISIL.

In July 2019, during an interview Khawla stated that he and his groups cooperated with the governments of Russia and Iraq. However he denied any cooperation with the Syrian government or Iran and criticized efforts by Iran and groups linked to Iran for spreading the Shiite sect in eastern Syria, and referred to them as occupation forces. He also stated that he had recruited several fighters from Turkish-backed groups and tribal militias in Deir ez-Zor, and he referred to areas under the control of Turkey and allied opposition groups as liberated areas. He also said if he were authorized by the coalition to attack Iranian forces and allied Shiite militias in Deir ez-Zor he would, and said regarding Iranian efforts to promote Shiism in Deir ez-Zor, "civilians are being displaced and killed, the names of Sunni mosques are being replaced with Shiite ones and religious centers are being constructed for them".

See also
Saddam al-Jamal
Liwa Owais al-Qorani
Liwa Thuwar al-Raqqa

References

Year of birth missing (living people)
Living people
Syrian Democratic Forces